Großer Mützelburger See (Jezioro Myśliborskie Wielkie) - is a lake in Ueckermünder Heide (Puszcza Wkrzańska), Vorpommern-Greifswald, Mecklenburg-Vorpommern, Germany and Police County, West Pomeranian Voivodeship, Poland. At an elevation of 4.5 m, its surface area is 1.14 km².

Lakes of Mecklenburg-Western Pomerania
Lakes of Poland
Lakes of West Pomeranian Voivodeship